Swimming at the 2018 Commonwealth Games was held at the Gold Coast Aquatic Centre in the Gold Coast, Australia from 5 to 10 April. A total of 50 events were scheduled. Of the 50, 38 were for able-bodied athletes (19 per gender). The remaining 12 were for para sport athletes (six per gender).

Schedule

Medal table

Medallists

Men's events

 Swimmers who participated in the heats only and received medals.

Women's events

Para events

Men's

Women's

Records

Broken Records in Swimming

Participating nations
There are 47 participating nations in swimming with a total of 363 athletes. The number of athletes a nation entered is in parentheses beside the name of the country.

References

External links
 Results Book – Swimming

 
2018
Commonwealth Games
2018 Commonwealth Games events
Swimming competitions in Australia